Katri Suutari (born 8 April 1976) is a Finnish archer. She competed in the women's individual event at the 2000 Summer Olympics.

References

External links
 

1976 births
Living people
Finnish female archers
Olympic archers of Finland
Archers at the 2000 Summer Olympics
People from Kouvola
Sportspeople from Kymenlaakso